The term "National Treasure" has been used in Japan to denote cultural properties since 1897,
although the definition and the criteria have changed since the introduction of the term. The swords and sword mountings in the list adhere to the current definition, and have been designated national treasures according to the Law for the Protection of Cultural Properties that came into effect on June 9, 1951. The items are selected by the Ministry of Education, Culture, Sports, Science and Technology based on their "especially high historical or artistic value". The list presents 110 swords and 12 sword mountings from ancient to feudal Japan, spanning from the late Kofun to the Muromachi period. The objects are 
housed in Buddhist temples, Shinto shrines, museums or held privately. The Tokyo National Museum houses the largest number of these national treasures, with 20 of the 122.

During the Yayoi period from about 300 BC to 300 AD, iron tools and weapons such as knives, axes, swords or spears, were introduced to Japan from China via the Korean peninsula. Shortly after this event, Chinese, Korean, and eventually Japanese swordsmiths produced ironwork locally. Swords were forged to imitate Chinese blades: generally straight chokutō with faulty tempering. Worn slung from the waist, they were likely used as stabbing and slashing weapons. Although functionally it would generally be more accurate to define them as hacking rather than slashing weapons. Swordmaking centers developed in Yamato, San'in and Mutsu where various types of blades such as tsurugi, tōsu and tachi were produced. Flat double-edged (hira-zukuri) blades originated in the Kofun period, and around the mid-Kofun period swords evolved from thrusting to cutting weapons. Ancient swords were also religious objects according to the 8th century chronicles Nihon Shoki and Kojiki. In fact, one of the Imperial Regalia of Japan is a sword, and swords have been discovered in ancient tumuli or handed down as treasures of Shinto shrines or Buddhist temples. Few ancient blades (jokotō) exist because the iron has been corroded by humidity.

The transition from straight jokotō or chokutō to deliberately curved, and much more refined Japanese swords (nihontō), occurred gradually over a long period of time, although few extant swords from the transition period exist. Dating to the 8th century, Shōsōin swords and the Kogarasu Maru show a deliberately produced curve. Yasutsuna from Hōki Province forged curved swords that are considered to be of excellent quality. Stylistic change since then is minimal, and his works are considered the beginning of the old sword (kotō) period, which existed until 1596, and produced the best-known Japanese swordsmiths. According to sources Yasutsuna may have lived in the Daidō era (806–809), around 900; or more likely, was a contemporary of Sanjō Munechika and active in the Eien era (987, 988). The change in blade shape increased with the introduction of horses (after 941) into the battlefield, from which sweeping cutting strokes with curved swords were more effective than stabbing lunges required of foot soldiers. Imparting a deliberate curve is a technological challenge requiring the reversal of natural bending that occurred when the sword edge is hammered. The development of a ridge (shinogi) along the blade was essential for construction. Various military conflicts during the Heian period helped to perfect the techniques of swordsmanship, and led to the establishment of swordsmiths around the country. They settled in locations close to administrative centers, where the demand for swords was high, and in areas with easy access to ore, charcoal and water. Originally smiths did not belong to any school or tradition. Around the mid to late-Heian period distinct styles of workmanship developed in certain regional centers. The best known of these schools or traditions are the gokaden (five traditions) with each producing a distinct style of workmanship and associated with the five provinces: Yamashiro, Yamato, Bizen, Sagami/Sōshū and Mino. These five schools produced about 80% of all kotō period swords. Each school consisted of several branches. In the late Heian period Emperor Go-Toba, a sword lover, summoned swordsmiths from the Awataguchi school of Yamashiro, the Ichimonji school of Bizen and the Aoe school of Bitchū Province to forge swords at his palace. These smiths, known as goban kaji (honorable rotation smiths) are considered to have been the finest swordsmiths of their time. Go-Toba selected from the Awataguchi, Hisakuni and Ichimonji Nobufusa to collaborate on his own tempering. Early Kamakura period tachi had an elaborately finished tang and an elegant dignified overall shape (sugata). Tantō daggers from the same period showed a slight outward curvature.

Around the mid-Kamakura period, the warrior class reached its peak of prosperity. Consequently, sword production was thriving in many parts of Japan. Following the Mongol invasions of 1274 and 1281, smiths aimed at producing stronger swords that would pierce the heavy armour of the invaders. To achieve this, tachi became wider, thicker with an overall grand appearance (sugata) and a straight temper line. With the Mongol threat dissipated at the end of the Kamakura period, this trend was partially reversed, as blades grew longer with a more dignified shape than those from the mid-Kamakura period. However the so-called "unchangeable smiths", including Rai Kunitoshi, Rai Kunimitsu, Osafune Nagamitsu and Osafune Kagemitsu, continued to produce swords of the elegant style of the late Heian/early Kamakura period. These swords were particularly popular with Kyoto's aristocracy. The production of tantō daggers increased considerably towards the late Kamakura period. Master tantō makers include Awataguchi Yoshimitsu, Rai Kunitoshi, Shintōgo Kunimitsu, Osafune Kagemitsu, Etchū Norishige and Samonji. The naginata appeared as a new weapon in the late Kamakura period. The confrontation between the Northern and Southern Court resulted in a 60-year-long power struggle between warrior lords known as the Nanboku-chō period and caused a tremendous demand for swords. The stylistic trends of the Kamakura period continued, and tachi were characterized by magnificent shape, growing in overall length and the length of the point (kissaki). They were generally wide and disproportionately thin. But also tantō shorter than those of the Kamakura period were being forged. The high demand for swords during feudal civil wars after 1467 (Sengoku period) resulted in mass production and low quality swords as swordsmiths no longer refined their own steel. There are no national treasure swords after this period.

Statistics

Usage
The table's columns (except for Remarks and Design and material) are sortable pressing the arrows symbols. The following gives an overview of what is included in the table and how the sorting works. Not all tables have all of the following columns.
Type/Name: type of sword or sword mounting; blades mentioned in the kyōhō era Kyōhō Meibutsuchō as masterpieces (meibutsu) are mentioned by name and marked in yellow
Signature: for signed swords, the signature and its reading; otherwise "unsigned"
Swordsmith: name of the swordsmith who forged the blade; if applicable it includes the name of the school; the ten students of Masamune (juttetsu) are marked in green; the goban kaji, smiths summoned to the court of Emperor Go-Toba are marked in blue
Remarks: additional information such as notable owners or its curvature
Date: period and year; the column entries sort by year. If the entry can only be dated to a time-period, they sort by the start year of that period
Length: distance from the notch to the tip of the sword
Present location: "temple/museum/shrine-name town-name prefecture-name"; column entries sort as "prefecture-name town-name temple/museum/shrine-name"

The table of sword mountings differentiates between Sword type and Mounting type; includes a column on the employed Design and material; and lists the Overall length as the mounting in addition to the sword's length.

Key

Treasures

Ancient swords (jokotō)

Four ancient straight swords (chokutō) and one tsurugi handed down in possession of temples and shrines have been designated as National Treasure craft items. A notable collection of 55 swords and other weapons from the 8th century have been preserved in the Shōsōin collection. Being under the supervision of the Imperial Household Agency, neither these items nor the well known Kogarasu Maru are National Treasures.

Old swords (kotō)
105 swords from the kotō period (late 10th century to 1596) including tachi (61), tantō (26), katana (11), ōdachi (3), naginata (2), tsurugi (1) and kodachi (1) have been designated as national treasures. They represent works of four of the five traditions: Yamato (5), Yamashiro (19), Sōshū (19), Bizen (45); and blades from Etchū Province (3), Bitchū Province (5), Hōki Province (2) and Saikaidō (7).

Yamato Province

The Yamato tradition is the oldest, originating as early as the 4th century with the introduction of ironworking techniques from the mainland. According to legend, the smith Amakuni forged the first single-edged long swords with curvature (tachi) around 700. Even though there is no authentication of this event or date, the earliest Japanese swords were probably forged in Yamato Province. During the Nara period, many good smiths were located around the capital in Nara. They moved to Kyoto when it became capital at the beginning of the Heian period, but about 1200 smiths gathered again in Nara when the various sects centered in Nara rose to power during the Kamakura period and needed weapons to arm their monks. Thus, the Yamato tradition is associated closely with the warrior monks of Nara. Yamato tradition sugata is characterized by a deep torii-zori, high shinogi, and slightly extended kissaki. The jihada is mostly masame-hada, and the hamon is suguha, with rough nie. The bōshi is mainly ko-maru. Generally the style of Yamato blades is considered to be restrained, conservative and static. Five major schools or branches of the Yamato tradition are distinguished: Senjuin, Shikkake, Taima, Tegai and Hōshō. Four of the five schools are represented by national treasure swords.

Yamashiro Province
The Yamashiro tradition was centered around the capital Kyoto in Yamashiro Province where swords were in high demand. Sanjō Munechika (c. 987) was a forerunner of this tradition, and the earliest identified smith working in Kyoto. Various branches of the Yamashiro tradition are distinguished: Sanjō, Awataguchi, Rai, Ayanokoji, Nobukuni, Hasebe and Heian-jo.

Yamashiro tradition sugata is characterized by torii-zori, smaller mihaba, slightly bigger kasane, funbari, and small kissaki. The jihada is dense small-grained itame-hada and the hamon is suguha in nie, or small-grain nie.

Sanjō, Ayanokoji and Hasebe schools
The Sanjō branch, named after a street in Kyoto and founded by Sanjō Munechika around 1000, is the oldest school in Yamashiro Province. In the early Kamakura period it was the most advanced school of swordsmanship in Japan. Sanjō Munechika's pieces, together with those of Yasutsuna from Hōki Province, consist of some of the oldest curved Japanese swords and mark the start of the old sword (kotō) period. Sanjō school's sugata is characterized by a much narrower upper area compared to the bottom, small kissaki, torii-zori and deep koshi-zori. The jihada uses good quality steel with abundant ji-nie and chikei, small mokume-hada mixed with wavy, large hada. The hamon is bright and covered with thick nioi. It is based on suguha mixed with small chōji midare. Hataraki appear along the temper line.

The Ayanokoji school is named for a street in Kyoto where the smith Sadatoshi lived, and may possibly be a branch of the Sanjō school. Ayanokoji tachi are slender with small kissaki. The jihada uses soft jigane, small mokume-hada mixed with masame-hada, abundant ji-nie, yubashiri and chikei. The temper line is small chōji midare, nie with much activity.

A later branch of the Yamashiro tradition, was the Hasebe school which was active in the Nanboku-chō period and early Muromachi period. It was founded by Hasebe Kunishige who originally came from Yamato Province. He travelled to Sagami Province where he became one of the ten great students of Masamune (Masamune juttetsu), and eventually went to Kyoto to found the Hasebe school. The sugata is characterized by a wide mihaba, thin kasane and shallow sori. The jihada is fine itame-hada mixed with masame-hada, chikei and abundant ji-nie. The hamon is of irregular width, narrow and small-patterned at the bottom and wide and large-patterned at the top of the blade. There are many tobiyaki and hitatsura as well as rough nie.

Awataguchi school

Located in the Awataguchi district of Kyoto, the Awataguchi school was active in the early and mid-Kamakura period. Leading members of the school were Kunitomo, whose tachi are similar to those of Sanjō Munechika, and Tōshirō Yoshimitsu, one of the most celebrated of all Japanese smiths. Yoshimitsu was the last of the significant smiths in the Awataguchi school, and the school was eventually replaced by the Rai school as the foremost school in Yamashiro Province.

Characteristic for this school are engraved gomabashi near the back ridge (mune), a long and slender tang (nakago), and the use of two-character signatures. Awataguchi sugata is in the early Kamakura period similar to that of the Sanjō school; later in the mid-Kamakura period it became ikubi kissaki with a wide mihaba. Tantō were normal sized with slight uchi-zori. The jihada is nashiji-hada of finest quality, dense small grain mokume-hada mixed with chikei, yubashiri appear, thick nie all over the ji The hamon is narrow, suguha mixed with small chōji midare.

Rai school
The Rai school, active from the mid-Kamakura period through the Nanboku-chō period, succeeded the Awataguchi school as the foremost school in Yamashiro Province. It was founded in the 13th century either by Kuniyuki or his father Kuniyoshi from the Awataguchi school. The name, "Rai" refers to the fact that smiths of this school preceded their signatures with the character "来" ("rai"). Rai school works show some characteristics of the later Sōshū tradition, especially in the work of Kunitsugu.

Rai school sugata resembles that of the late Heian/early Kamakura period being both gentle and graceful, but grander and with a more vigorous workmanship. Starting with Kunimitsu, the kissaki becomes larger. The jihada is small-grain mokume-hada, dense with ji-nie, yubashiri and chikei. The quality of the jigane is slightly inferior to that of the Awataguchi school. The hamon shows medium suguha with chōji midare.

Sōshū or Sagami Province

The Sōshū (or Sagami) tradition owes its origin to the patronage of the Kamakura shogunate set up by Minamoto no Yoritomo in 1185 in Kamakura, Sagami Province. Though the conditions for swordsmithing were not favourable, the intense military atmosphere and high demand for swords helped to establish the school. The tradition is believed to have originated in 1249, when Awataguchi Kunitsuna from the Yamashiro tradition forged a tachi for Hōjō Tokiyori. Other recognized founders were Ichimonji Sukezane and Saburo Kunimune, both from the Bizen tradition. The Sōshū tradition's popularity increased after the Mongol invasions (1274, 1281). It is characterized by tantō daggers that were produced in large quantities; but also tachi and katana were forged.

During the early Sōshū tradition, from the late Kamakura period to the beginning of the Nanboku-chō period, the smiths' goal was to produce swords that exhibited splendor and toughness, incorporating some of the best features of the Bizen and Yamashiro traditions. The Midare Shintōgo by Awataguchi Kunitsuna's son, Shintōgo Kunimitsu, is considered to be the first true Sōshū tradition blade. Shintōgo Kunimitsu was the teacher of Yukimitsu and of Masamune who is widely recognized as Japan's greatest swordsmith. Together with Sadamune, whose work looks modest compared to Masamune's, these are the most representative smiths of the early Sōshū tradition. Sōshū tradition sugata is characterized by a shallow torii-zori, bigger mihaba, smaller kasane, medium or large kissaki. The jihada is mostly itame-hada with ji-nie and chikei and the hamon is gunome, midareba and hitatsura. Nie, sunagashi and kinsuji are often visible in the hamon.

Bizen Province
Bizen Province became an early center of iron production and swordmaking because of the proximity to the continent. Conditions for sword production were ideal: good iron sand; charcoal and water were readily available; and the San'yōdō road ran right through the province. Bizen has been the only province to produce swords continuously from the Heian to the Edo period. In kotō times, a large number of skilled swordsmiths lived along the lower reaches of the Yoshii river around Osafune making it the largest center of sword production in Japan. Bizen province not only dominated in the numbers of blades produced but also in quality; and Bizen swords have long been celebrated for excellent swordsmanship. The peak of the Bizen tradition, marked by a gorgeous and luxurious style, was reached in the mid-Kamakura period. Later, in the 13th century, the Ichimonji and Osafune schools, the mainstream schools of Bizen Province, maintained the Heian style of the Ko-Bizen, the oldest school in Bizen province. After the 13th century, swords became wider and the point (kissaki) longer, most likely as a response to the thick armour of the invading Mongols. Mass production due to heavy demand for swords from the early 15th to the 16th century led to a lower quality of blades. The Bizen tradition is associated with a deep koshi-zori, a standard mihaba, bigger kasane with medium kissaki. The jihada is itame-hada often accompanied by utsuri. The hamon is chōji midare in nioi deki.

Ko-Bizen

The oldest branch of swordmaking in Bizen Province is the Ko-Bizen (old Bizen) school. It was founded by Tomonari who lived around the early 12th century. The school flourished in the late Heian period (10th–12th century) and continued into the Kamakura period. Three great swordsmiths—Kanehira, Masatsune and Tomonari—are associated with the school. Ko-Bizen tachi are generally thin, have a strong koshi-zori and small kissaki. The grain is itame-hada or small itame-hada and the hamon is small midare made of nie in combination with chōji and gunome.

Ichimonji school
The Ichimonji school was founded by Norimune in the late Heian period. Together with the Osafune it was one of the main branches of the Bizen tradition and continued through the Kamakura period with a peak of prosperity before the mid-Kamakura period. The name  refers to the signature (mei) on swords of this school. Many smiths signed blades with only a horizontal line (read as "ichi", translated as "one"); however signatures exist that contain only the smith's name, or "ichi" plus the smith's name, and unsigned blades exist as well. From the early Ichimonji school (Ko-Ichimonji), the "ichi" signature looks like a diagonal line and might have been a mark instead of a character. From the mid-Kamakura period however, "ichi" is definitely the character and not a mark. Some Ichimonji smiths lived in Fukuoka village, Osafune and others in Yoshioka village. They are known as Fukuoka-Ichimonji and Yoshioka-Ichimonji respectively, and were typically active in the early to mid-Kamakura period (Fukuoka-Ichimonji) and the late-Kamakura period (Yoshioka-Ichimonji) respectively.

The workmanship of early Ichimonji smiths such as Norimune resembles that of the Ko-Bizen school: tachi have a narrow mihaba, deep koshi-zori, funbari and an elegant sugata with small kissaki. The hamon is small midare or small midare with small chōji midare in small nie.

Around the middle Kamakura period tachi have a wide mihaba and grand sugata with medium kissaki such as ikubi kissaki. The hamon is large chōji midare or juka chōji in nioi deki and irregular width. Particularly the hamon of tachi with just the "ichi" signature is wide chōji. The hamon of this period's Ichimonji school is one of the most gorgeous amongst kotō smiths and comparable to Masamune and his students' works. The most characteristic works for mid-Kamakura period Ichimonji school were produced by Yoshifusa, Sukezane and Norifusa. Yoshifusa, who left the largest number of blades, and Norifusa might each in fact have been several smiths using the same name.

Osafune school
Founded by Mitsutada in the mid-Kamakura period in Osafune, the Osafune school continued through to the end of the Muromachi period. It was for a long time the most prosperous of the Bizen schools and a great number of master swordsmiths belonged to it. Nagamitsu (also called Junkei Nagamitsu), the son of Mitsutada, was the second generation, and Kagemitsu the third generation.

Osafune sugata is characteristic for the period and similar to that of the Ichimonji school: a wide mihaba and ikubi kissaki. After the 13th century the curve moved from koshi-zori to torii-zori. Other stylistic features depend on the swordsmith. In the hamon, Mitsutada adopted the Ichimonji style of large chōji midare mixed with juka chōji and a unique kawazuko chōji; Nagamitsu produced also chōji midare hower with a different pattern and mixed with considerable gunome midare. Starting with Kagemitsu the hamon became suguha and gunome midare. Kagemitsu is also credited with the invention of kataochi gunome. Mitsutada's bōshi is midare komi with short kaeri or yakitsume. Nagamitsu and Kagemitsu use a sansaku bōshi. Kagemitsu is also known as one of the finest engravers particularly through his masterpiece Koryū Kagemitsu.

Saburo Kunimune school
Like the Osafune school, the Saburo Kunimune school was located in Osafune, however the swordsmiths are from a different lineage than those of Mitsutada and his school. The name, "saburo", refers to the fact that Kunimune, the founder of the school, was the third son of Kunizane. Kunimune later moved to Sagami Province to found the Sōshū tradition together with Ichimonji Sukezane. There were two generations of Kunimune, and their work is very difficult to distinguish. This school's workmanship is similar to that of other smiths of the time but with a slightly coarse jihada and with hajimi.

Other countries

Etchū Province

Two of Masamune's ten excellent students (juttetsu), Norishige and Gō Yoshihiro, lived in Etchū Province at the end of the Kamakura period. While none of Gō Yoshihiro's works is signed, there are extant signed tantō and tachi by Norishige. One tantō by Norishige and two katana by Gō Yoshihiro have been designated as national treasures. Generally Norishige's sugata is characteristic of the time: tantō are with not-rounded fukura and uchi-zori, thick kasane and steep slopes of iori-mune. The jihada is matsukawa-hada with thick ji-nie, many chikei along the o-hada. The jigane is not equal to that of Masamune or Gō Yoshihiro. Norishige hamon is relatively wide and made up of bright and larger nie based in notare mixed with suguha chōji midare or with gunome midare. Gō Yoshihiro produced various sugata with either small kissaki and narrow mihaba or with wider mihaba and larger kissaki. His jihada is identical to that of the Awataguchi school in Yamashiro Province: soft jigane, small mokume-hada mixed with wavy ō-hada. Thick ji-nie becomes yubashiri with chikei. The hamon has an ichimai or ichimonji bōshi with ashi and abundant nie. The kaeri is short or yakitsume.

Bitchū Province
The mainstream school of Bitchū Province was the Aoe school named after a place presently located in Kurashiki. It appeared at the end of the Heian period and thrived in the ensuing Kamakura period. The quality of Aoe swords was swiftly recognized, as 3 of the 12 smiths at Emperor Go-Toba's court were of this school. Five tachi blades of the early aoe school (ko-aoe, before the Ryakunin era, 1238/39) have been designated national treasures. The ko-aoe school consists of two families employing a similar style of swordsmanship that did not deviate with time. The first family was represented by the founder Yasutsugu and, among others, Sadatsugu, Tametsugu, Yasutsugu (the one in this list) and Moritoshi. The second family, named "Senoo", was founded by Noritake who was followed by Masatsune, and others. Ko-Aoe produced slender tachi with small kissaki and deep koshi-zori. A distinctive feature of this school is the jihada which is chirimen-hada and sumigane (dark and plain steel). The hamon is midare based on suguha with ashi and yō. The boshi is midare komi or suguha with a short kaeri, yakitsume.

Hōki Province

The work of Yasutsuna who lived in Hōki Province predates that of the Ko-Bizen school. Though old sources date his activity to the early 9th century, he was most likely a contemporary of Sanjō Munechika. The first forging of the first curved Japanese swords has been attributed to these two smiths. Yasutsuna founded the school with the same name. Two tachi of the Yasutsuna school have been designated as national treasures: one, the Dōjigiri Yasutsuna by Yasutsuna has been named the "most celebrated of all Japanese swords"; the other is by his student Yasuie. The Dōjigiri has torii-zori, distinct funbari, small kissaki; its jihada is mokume-hada with abundant ji-nie. The hamon is small midare consisting of thick nioi and abundant small nie. There are many vivid ashi visible. Yō and kinsuji appear inside the hamon. The work of other school members including Yasuie's is characterized by coarse mokume-hada, black jigane, ji-nie and chikei. The hamon is small midare consisting of nie with kinsuji and sunagashi.

Saikaidō (Chikuzen, Chikugo, Bungo Province)
Through rich cultural exchange with China and Korea facilitated by the proximity to the continent, iron manufacture had been practiced on Kyūshū (Saikaidō) since earliest times. Swordsmiths were active from the Heian period onwards. Initially the Yamato school's influence is evident all over the island. However, distance from other swordmaking centers such as Yamato or Yamashiro caused the workmanship to remain static as smiths maintained old traditions and shunned innovations. Kyūshū blades, therefore, demonstrate a classic workmanship. The old Kyūshū smiths are represented by Bungo Yukihira from Bungo Province, the Miike school active in Chikugo Province and the Naminohira school of Satsuma Province. Two old blades, one by Miike Mitsuyo and the other by Bungo Yukihira, and five later blades from the 14th century, have been designated as national treasures from Kyūshū. They originate from three provinces: Chikugo, Chikuzen, and Bungo. Generally Kyūshū blades are characterized by a sugata that looks old having a wide shinogi. The jihada is mokume-hada that tends to masame-hada or becomes ayasugi-hada. The jigana is soft and there are ji-nie and chikei present. The hamon is small midare made up of nie and based on suguha. The edge of the hamon starts just above the hamachi.

The work of Saemon Saburo Yasuyoshi (or Sa, Samonji, Ō-Sa) is much more sophisticated than that of other Kyūshū smiths. As a student of Masamune he was influenced by the Sōshū tradition which is evident in his blades. Sa was active from the end of the Kamakura period to the early Nanboku-chō period and was the founder of the Samonji school in Chikuzen Province to which also Yukihiro belonged. He produced mainly tantō and a few extant tachi. The Samonji school had a great influence during the Nanboku-chō period.

Sword mountings
For protection and preservation, a polished Japanese sword needs a scabbard. A fully mounted scabbard (koshirae) may consist of a lacquered body, a taped hilt, a sword guard (tsuba) and decorative metal fittings. Though the original purpose was to protect a sword from damage, from early times on Japanese sword mountings became a status symbol and were used to add dignity. Starting in the Heian period, a sharp distinction was made between swords designed for use in battle and those for ceremonial use. Tachi long swords were worn edge down suspended by two cords or chains from the waist belt. The cords were attached to two eyelets on the scabbard.

Decorative sword mountings of the kazari-tachi type carried on the tradition of ancient straight Chinese style tachi and were used by nobles at court ceremonies until the Muromachi period. They contained a very narrow crude unsharpened blade. Two mountain-shaped metal fittings were provided to attach the straps; the scabbard between was covered by a (tube) fitting. The hilt was covered with ray skin and the scabbard typically decorated in maki-e or mother of pearl.

Another type of mounting that became fashionable around the mid-Heian period is the kenukigata, or hair-tweezer style, named for the characteristically shaped hilt, which is pierced along the center. In this style, the hilt is fitted with an ornamental border and did not contain any wooden covering. Like kazari-tachi, swords with this mounting were used for ceremonial purposes but also in warfare, as an example held at Ise Grand Shrine shows.

From the end of the Heian and into the Kamakura period, hyōgo-gusari were fashionable mountings for tachi. Along the edge of both the scabbard and the hilt they were decorated with a long ornamental border. They were originally designed for use in battle and worn by high-ranking generals together with armour; but in the Kamakura period they were made due to their gorgeous appearance exclusively for the dedication at temples and Shinto shrines. The corresponding blades from that time are unusable.

During the Kamakura and Muromachi period, samurai wore a short sword known as koshigatana in addition to the long tachi. Koshigatana were stuck directly into the belt in the same way as later the katana. They had a mounting without a guard (tsuba). The corresponding style is known as aikuchi ("fitting mouth") as the mouth of the scabbard meets the hilt directly without intervening guard.

See also
Japanese sword
Japanese sword mountings
Glossary of Japanese swords
Nara Research Institute for Cultural Properties
Tokyo Research Institute for Cultural Properties
Independent Administrative Institution National Museum

Notes
General

Jargon

References

Bibliography

Swords
Individual Japanese swords
Craft materials
National Treasures of Japan